Flowers of Flame is a 1973 novel by Bangladeshi author Humayun Ahmed. It was his second book after his debut novel Nondito Noroke.

Characters
 Rabeya 
 Khoka
 Runu 
 Jhunu
 Montu
 Ninu 
 Farid
 Motin Uddin's Boss
 Abed Hossen
 Doctor
 House-help 
 Shirin (Mrs. Motin Uddin)
 Motin Uddin 
 Kitki
 Choto Khalu
 Choto Khala

Adaptation
The book was made into the 1992 film with the same title, starring Zafar Iqbal, Champa, Dolly Johur, Abul Hayat, Suborna Mustafa and Asaduzzaman Noor.

References

External links
 on Good Reads.

1973 novels
Bengali-language novels
Bangladeshi novels
Novels by Humayun Ahmed